Yelena Stanislavovna Nagovitsyna (born 7 December 1982 in Udmurtia) is a Russian long-distance runner. At the 2012 Summer Olympics, she competed in the Women's 5000 metres, finishing 9th overall in Round 1, qualifying for the final, finishing in 13th position. In her qualifying round she achieved her personal best at 5000 metres, with a time of 15:02.80.  In the same event, she finished in 9th place at the 2013 World Championships.

References

1982 births
Living people
Sportspeople from Udmurtia
Russian female long-distance runners
Olympic female long-distance runners
Olympic athletes of Russia
Athletes (track and field) at the 2012 Summer Olympics
World Athletics Championships athletes for Russia
Russian Athletics Championships winners
20th-century Russian women
21st-century Russian women